Kumla Municipality (Kumla kommun) is a municipality in Örebro County in central Sweden. Its seat is located in the city of Kumla.

The present municipality was formed during the latest nationwide local government reform in Sweden, with the amalgamations taking place in 1966 and 1971.

With 207 km2 it is the smallest municipality in Örebro County.

Localities 
 Ekeby
 Hällabrottet
 Kumla (seat)
 Kvarntorp
 Sannahed
 Åbytorp

Riksdag elections

Twin towns
Kumla's three twin towns with the year of its establishing:
(1968) Frederikssund Municipality, Denmark 
(1981) Sipoo (Sibbo), Finland 
(1988) Aurskog-Høland, Norway

References

External links

Kumla Municipality - Official site

 
Municipalities of Örebro County